Death Wish: Original Soundtrack Recording is a soundtrack album by Herbie Hancock featuring music composed for Dino De Laurentiis' film  Death Wish released on October 11, 1974, on Columbia Records.

Track listing
 "Death Wish (Main Title)" - 6:14
 "Joanna's Theme" - 4:46
 "Do a Thing" - 2:13
 "Paint Her Mouth" - 2:17
 "Rich Country" - 3:46
 "Suite Revenge: (a) Striking Back, (b) Riverside Park, (c) The Alley, (d) Last Stop, (e) 8th Avenue Station" - 9:25
 "Ochoa Knose" - 2:08
 "Party People" - 3:33
 "Fill Your Hand" - 6:16
All compositions by Herbie Hancock

Personnel
Herbie Hancock: piano, Fender Rhodes electric piano, Hohner D-6 Clavinet, ARP Odyssey, ARP Soloist, ARP 2600, ARP String Ensemble, conductor, arranger
Jerry Peters: conductor, arranger (tracks 1, 2, 5, and 6b)
The Headhunters Band with Wah Wah Watson

References

Jazz fusion albums by American artists
Herbie Hancock soundtracks
1974 soundtrack albums
Action film soundtracks
Columbia Records soundtracks
Albums produced by Dave Rubinson
Albums recorded at Wally Heider Studios
Death Wish (franchise)